The Icelandic Art Center (IAC) is the platform for Icelandic visual art activities. IAC promotes Icelandic art by connecting the local visual art community with the international art network. IAC enforces national and international collaborations in order to improve opportunities for Icelandic artists in their home country and to increase their visibility abroad.

The Icelandic Art Center was founded in 2005 and is located at Lækjargata 3 in Reykjavík.

Its main objectives are to provide an information center; promote Icelandic art and mediation to international art events; commission the Icelandic Pavilion at Venice Biennale; initiate exhibitions and conference; and have a visitor program. In 2007, Frida Bjørk Ingvarsdóttir was the chairwoman of the IAC.

See also 
 Culture of Iceland
 Sequences Art Festival

References

External links 
 IAC website
 LIST icelandic art news
 SEQUENCES real-time art festival 2008
 HOMESICK
 Myndstef (The Icelandic Visual Artists Copyright Association)
 SÍM (The Association of Icelandic Visual Artists)

Art museums and galleries in Iceland
Icelandic art
Art museums established in 2005
Museums in Reykjavík